The Monument to the Unknown Woman Worker is a 1992 sculpture by Louise Walsh in Belfast, Northern Ireland.

The sculpture is located on the city's Great Victoria Street adjacent to the Europa Hotel. It is cast in bronze and features two working-class women with symbols of women's work embedded on the surfaces. Domestic items such as colanders, a shopping basket and clothes pegs are part of the sculpture.

The Department of the Environment's original commission, in the late 1980s, was for an artwork to reflect the nearby Amelia Street's history as a red-light district. Walsh's design "Monument to the Unknown Woman Worker" was accepted by the project's landscape architect and the Art in Public Spaces Research Group, however the Belfast Development Office and the Belfast City Council opposed the project and the selected design, and the project was dropped in 1989.

Walsh was born in County Cork, and received her MA in sculpture from the University of Ulster.

References

Outdoor sculptures in Northern Ireland
1992 sculptures
Bronze sculptures in the United Kingdom
Monuments and memorials to women
1992 establishments in Northern Ireland
Sculptures of women in the United Kingdom